Collegium Carolinum may refer to

 Karolinum the historic building of the Charles University in Prague
Carolinum, Zürich, the predecessor of the University of Zurich
 Collegium Carolinum (Kassel), a former research and teaching institution in Kassel, operated 1709–1785
 TU Braunschweig in Germany was founded in 1745 as Collegium Carolinum
 The dissolved German Charles-Ferdinand University in Prague was continued in Munich as Collegium Carolinum (1956–)

See also
 Gymnasium Carolinum (Osnabrück)